Yves Lévesque (born 1957) is a Canadian politician, who served as Mayor of Trois-Rivières between 2001 and 2018.

Career

City Councillor
Lévesque won his first electoral victory in 1994, when he became city councilor in Trois-Rivières-Ouest. He was re-elected in 1998.

Mayor of Trois-Rivières
In the wake of the province-wide municipal merging of 2001, he ran for Mayor of Trois-Rivières and won an upset victory against favourite candidate and Cap-de-la-Madeleine Mayor Alain Croteau. In the 2003 provincial election, he campaigned in favour of the re-election of Parti Québécois incumbent Guy Julien, who lost.

In 2005, Julien ran against Lévesque for mayor, but the incumbent was easily re-elected with 70% of the vote.

Recently, Lévesque has been trying to get the Trois-Rivières Draveurs, a franchise of the Quebec Major Junior Hockey League, back in town.

On December 27, 2018, Lévesque announced he was retiring as mayor for medical reasons.

Federal politics

Lévesque officially joined the Conservative Party of Canada in May 2018, taking out a party membership and speaking at the party's convention in Saint-Hyacinthe. He stated at the time that he was considering running for the party in the 43rd election. He joined the Conservative Party because of its stated goal of decentralizing power to the provinces.

On May 30, 2019, Lévesque was named the Conservative candidate for the riding of Trois-Rivières. During the race, he was expected to win; however, he lost the race, standing third. Lévesque blamed party leader Andrew Scheer's first French-language debate, wherein Scheer's perceived inability to defend his personal views from the other leaders shifted support from the Conservatives in Quebec, which never recovered.

Lévesque ran in Trois-Rivières again as a Conservative in 2021 and gained 17,027 votes (an increase of 1,787) but came in second.

Electoral record

Federal

Municipal (mayoral)

2017

2013

2009

2005

Footnotes

1957 births
Living people
Conservative Party of Canada candidates for the Canadian House of Commons
Mayors of Trois-Rivières
Trois-Rivières city councillors